Wilmington Boat Works, Inc. or WILBO was a shipbuilding company in Wilmington, California. To support the World War 2 demand for ships Victory Shipbuilding built: Tugboats, crash rescue boats and sub chasers. Wilmington Boat Works opened in 1920 building Fishing boat and yachts, by Hugh Angelman, Willard Buchanan and Tom Smith. After the Korean War the shipyard closed in 1958. The shipyard was located at 400 Yacht Street, Wilmington, the site of the current USC boatyard.

Tugboats
Wilmington Boat Works built tugboats for the US Army in 1943 and 1944. They were wooden-hulled and diesel-powered. After the war they were sold for commercial use. The tugs were numbered TP 126 to TP 131, TP for "Tug/Passenger".

Submarine chaser
They had a crew of 28. Power was provided by two  General Motors, Electro-Motive Division, 16-184A diesel engines, and two propellers. They were armed with one Bofors 40 mm gun, two Browning M2 .50 cal. machine gun, two depth charge projector "Y guns", and two depth charge tracks. Some of the submarine chasers were lent to Allies of the United States as part of the Lend-Lease program.

The submarine chasers were converted to PGM-1-class motor gunboats six months after completion in 1943.

Crah boats
For the US Army built 85 foot Crash boats

Agile-class minesweeper

The ship crew was 7 officers and 70 enlisted men. They were armed with one Bofors 40 mm gun and two .50 cal (12.7 mm) twin machine gun.

Notable boats
 The Sobre Las Olas, a  yacht built in 1929 was used by the US Navy in 1941 as YP-131. In 1945 it was sold to J. Paul Getty. Getty sold the boat in 1932. Sobre Las Olas was the setting of the 1957 movie Pal Joey with Frank Sinatra and Rita Hayworth. The vessel was also used in the 2012 movie Liz & Dick with Lindsay Lohan playing Elizabeth Taylor.
 Chubasco is a  sailboat built in 1939, that won the 2016 Show Awards for Best of Show at the Marina in Newport.

Notable incident
  a  wooden luxury yacht built in 1931 was found wrecked off Vanua Levu and 25 passengers and crew mysteriously disappeared in October 1955.  Life rafts were missing, but no one was found. She was repaired and sold.

See also
California during World War II
Maritime history of California

References

American Theater of World War II
1940s in California
American boat builders